Azeem (Arabic: "Great") is both a given name and a surname. Notable people with the name include:

Given name:
 Azeem (rapper), American hip hop musician born Azeem Ismail
 Azeem Funkara, OP PUBG Mobile Player from India
 Azeem Ghumman, Pakistani cricketer
 Azeem Hafeez, Pakistani cricketer
 Azeem Pitcher, Bermudian cricketer
 Azeem Rafiq, English cricketer
 Azeem Ahmed Tariq, Pakistani politician
 Azeem Victor, American football player

Surname:
 Neelima Azeem, Indian actor